Elk City Regional Business Airport  is a city-owned public-use airport located one mile northeast of the central business district of Elk CIty, a city in Beckham County, Oklahoma, United States.

There is also an airport in Elk City, Idaho.  The FAA LID for that one is S90.

Facilities and aircraft 
Elk City Regional Airport covers an area of 364 acres at an elevation of 2,013 feet (613.6 m) above mean sea level. It has one runway: 17/35 is 5,399 by 75 feet (1,646 x 23 m) with an asphalt surface.  

For the 12-month period ending April 25, 2008, the airport had 2,000 aircraft operations, an average of 38 per week: 100% general aviation. At that time there were 23 aircraft based at this airport: 20 single-engine, 1 multi-engine and 1 helicopter and 1 ultralight.

References

External links 
 
 

Airports in Oklahoma
Transportation in Beckham County, Oklahoma